Cardiniidae is a family of bivalves in the order Carditida.

References

External links 
 
 Cardiniidae at ITIS

Prehistoric bivalve families
Carditida